American Airlines Flight 965 was a regularly scheduled flight from Miami International Airport in Miami, Florida, to Alfonso Bonilla Aragón International Airport in Cali, Colombia. On December 20, 1995, the Boeing 757-200 flying this route (registration ) crashed into a mountain in Buga, Colombia, around 9:40 pm killing 151 of the 155 passengers and all eight crew members.

The crash was the first U.S.-owned 757 accident and is currently the deadliest aviation accident to occur in Colombia. It was also the deadliest accident involving a Boeing 757 at that time, but was surpassed by Birgenair Flight 301 which crashed seven weeks later with 189 fatalities. Flight 965 was the deadliest air disaster involving a U.S. carrier since the bombing of Pan Am Flight 103 in 1988.

The Colombian Special Administrative Unit of Civil Aeronautics investigated the accident and determined it was caused by navigational errors by the flight crew.

Aircraft

The aircraft was a Boeing 757–223 registered N651AA. Its first flight was on August 12, 1991, and was delivered to American Airlines on August 27, 1991; it was the 390th Boeing 757 built. The aircraft was powered by two Rolls-Royce RB211 engines.

Flight history

Departure
At that time, Flight 965 mainly carried people returning to Colombia for the Christmas holiday, vacationers, and businesspeople. A winter storm in the Northeast United States caused the airline to delay the departure of the airliner for 30 minutes to allow for connecting passengers to board the flight, and seasonal congestion caused further delay. Flight 965 took off at 6:35 pm EST (23:35 UTC), nearly two hours late.

The cockpit crew consisted of Captain Nicholas Tafuri (57), and First Officer Donald "Don" Williams (39). Both pilots were considered to be highly skilled airmen. Captain Tafuri had more than 13,000 hours of flying experience (including 2,260 hours on the Boeing 757/767), and First Officer Williams had almost 6,000 hours, with 2,286 of them on the Boeing 757/767.

Captain Tafuri had flown with the United States Air Force from 1963 to 1969 and served in the Vietnam War, and joined American Airlines in 1969. First Officer Williams had flown with the U.S. Air Force from 1979 to 1986, and joined American Airlines in 1986.

Going off-course
Cali's air traffic controllers had no functional radar to monitor the 757, as it had been blown up in 1992 by the terror group FARC. Cali's approach uses several radio beacons to guide pilots around the mountains and canyons that surround the city. The airplane's flight management system (FMS) navigation computer already had these beacons programmed in, and should have, in theory, told the pilots exactly where to turn, climb, and descend, all the way from Miami to the terminal in Cali.

Since the wind was calm, Cali's controllers asked the pilots whether they wanted to fly a non-precision straight-in approach to runway 19 rather than coming around for a precision ILS-approach to runway 01. The pilots agreed to the straight-in approach, hoping to make up some time. The pilots then erroneously cleared all the programmed approach waypoints from the flight plan in the aircraft FMS. When the controller asked the pilots to report passing over the Tulua VOR (identified as "ULQ") north of Cali, it was no longer programmed into the FMS flight plan, so they had to find the VOR identifier "ULQ" in their approach chart. In the meantime, they extended the aircraft's speed brakes to slow it down and expedite its descent.

By the time the pilots had selected the Tulua VOR identifier "ULQ" into the FMS flight plan they had already passed over it. The pilots then tried to select the next approach waypoint Rozo in the FMS. However, the Rozo non-directional beacon (NDB) was identified as "R" in their approach chart but not in the FMS. Instead the FMS database used a different naming convention and identified the Rozo NDB as "ROZO". By selecting "R" from the waypoint list, the captain caused the autopilot to start flying a course to Bogotá, resulting in the airplane turning east in a wide semicircle. The pilots then attempted to correct this by turning back to the south. By the time the error was detected, the aircraft was in a valley running roughly north–south parallel to the one they should have been in. The pilots had put the aircraft on a collision course with a  mountain. The air traffic controller, Nelson Rivera Ramírez, believed that some of the requests of the pilots did not make sense, but did not know enough non-aviation English to convey this.

Crash
Twelve seconds before the plane hit the mountain, named El Diluvio (the Deluge), the ground proximity warning system (GPWS) activated, announcing an imminent terrain collision and sounding an alarm. Within a second of this warning, the first officer disengaged the autopilot, and the captain attempted to climb clear of the mountain. Within two seconds of the warning, take-off power was selected, and in the next second, pitch was increased to 20.6° upwards, causing activation of the stick shaker. The stick shaker mechanically vibrates the control yoke (the "stick") to warn the flight crew of an imminent aerodynamic stall.

When take-off power was selected, neither pilot had remembered to disengage the previously deployed speed brakes, which were fully extended and significantly reduced the rate of climb. Initially, the aircraft cleared the summit, but struck the trees with the tail and crashed shortly after the summit.

Five passengers, all seated within two rows of each other, survived the initial impact, but one died two days later of his injuries. In addition to the four human survivors, a dog, which had been in a carrier in the cargo hold at the time of the crash, survived the accident.

Crash investigation and final report
The crash was investigated by the Special Administrative Unit of Civil Aeronautics of the Republic of Colombia, with assistance from the U.S. National Transportation Safety Board (NTSB), as well as other parties, including the U.S. Federal Aviation Administration, Allied Pilots Association, American Airlines, Boeing Commercial Airplane Group, and Rolls-Royce Engines.

The investigations revealed that neither the Boeing fixed-base simulator nor the flight management system simulator could be backdriven with the data obtained directly from the accident airplane's flight data recorder (FDR). Because the airplane would have continued to climb and had the potential to increase its rate of climb, it might well have cleared the trees at the top of the mountain.

The Civil Aeronautics prepared a final report of its investigation in September 1996, which was released through the U.S. NTSB.

In its report, the Civil Aeronautics determined these probable causes of the accident:

 The flight crew's failure to adequately plan and execute the approach to runway 19 at SKCL and their inadequate use of automation
 Failure of the flight crew to discontinue the approach into Cali, despite numerous cues alerting them of the inadvisability of continuing the approach
 The lack of situational awareness of the flight crew regarding vertical navigation, proximity to terrain, and the relative location of critical radio aids
 Failure of the flight crew to revert to basic radio navigation at the time when the flight management system-assisted navigation became confusing and demanded an excessive workload in a critical phase of the flight

In addition, the Civil Aeronautics determined that these factors contributed to the accident:

 The flight crew's ongoing efforts to expedite their approach and landing to avoid potential delays
 The flight crew's execution of the ground proximity warning system escape maneuver while the speedbrakes remained deployed
 FMS logic that dropped all intermediate fixes from the display(s) in the event of execution of a direct routing
 FMS-generated navigational information that used a different naming convention from that published in navigational charts

The Civil Aeronautics'''s report also included a variety of safety-related recommendations to the involved parties (number of individual recommendations in parentheses):

U.S. FAA (17)
International Civil Aviation Organization (3)
American Airlines (2)

Investigators later labeled the accident a nonsurvivable event, citing the impact forces and subsequent destruction of the aircraft.

Aftermath
Scavengers took engine thrust reversers, cockpit avionics, and other components from the crashed 757, using Colombian military and private helicopters to go to and from the crash site. Many of the stolen components reappeared as unapproved aircraft parts on the black market in Greater Miami parts brokers. In response, the airline published a 14-page list stating all of the parts missing from the crashed aircraft. The list included the serial numbers of all of the parts.

In 1997, U.S. District Judge Stanley Marcus ruled that the pilots had committed "willful misconduct"; the ruling applied to American Airlines, which represented the dead pilots. The judge's ruling was subsequently reversed in June 1999 by the U.S. Court of Appeals in Atlanta, which also overturned the jury verdict and declared that the judge in the case was wrong in issuing a finding of fault with the pilots, a role which should have been reserved for the jury only.

American Airlines settled numerous lawsuits brought against it by the families of the victims of the accident. American Airlines filed a "third-party complaint" lawsuit for contribution against Jeppesen and Honeywell, which made the navigation computer database and failed to include the coordinates of Rozo under the identifier "R"; the case went to trial in United States District Court for the Southern District of Florida in Miami. At the trial, American Airlines admitted that it bore some legal responsibility for the accident. Honeywell and Jeppesen each contended that they had no legal responsibility for the accident. In June 2000, the jury found that Jeppesen was 30% at fault for the crash, Honeywell was 10% at fault, and American Airlines was 60% at fault.

An enhanced ground proximity warning system (EGPWS) that could have prevented the accident was introduced in 1996.

Since 2002, aircraft capable of carrying more than six passengers are required to have an advanced terrain awareness warning system.

, American Airlines continued to operate the Miami-Cali route, as American Airlines Flight 921, operated by Boeing 737-800 aircraft.

Notable passengers
 Paris Kanellakis, a computer scientist at Brown University, died with his wife and two children.

The U.S. government encountered difficulty while trying to distinguish Americans from non-Americans, as many passengers held dual citizenships.

In popular culture
 The events of Flight 965 were featured in "Lost", a season-two (2005) episode of the Canadian TV series Mayday (called Air Emergency and Air Disasters in the U.S. and Air Crash Investigation in the UK and elsewhere around the world). The episode was broadcast with the title "Crash on the Mountain" in the United Kingdom, Australia, and Asia.
 The accident was also featured on Why Planes Crash on MSNBC, in a 2015 episode titled "Sudden Impact".
 The 2018 episode "Disastrous Descents" of the TV series Aircrash Confidential, produced by WMR Productions and IMG Entertainment, featured the accident.
 A documentary film released in 2021, American 965, directed and produced by a former British Airways captain with Fact Not Fiction Films, suggests a different possible cause for the accident.Outlook, a BBC World Service radio program, had an episode titled "The Father and Daughter Finding Closure After a Plane Crash", which consisted of interviews with two of the survivors of the crash.
The accident is featured prominently in the 2011 novel The Sound of Things Falling by Colombian author Juan Gabriel Vasquez.

See also
 List of aircraft accidents and incidents resulting in at least 50 fatalities

Similar accidents
Santa Barbara Airlines Flight 518
Trigana Air Flight 267
Air China Flight 129
Air Inter Flight 148
Thai Airways International Flight 311
Prinair Flight 277

 References 

 External links 

Special Administrative Unit of Civil Aeronautics
Final Accident Report – AA965
Text version of final report – Prepared for the World Wide Web by Peter Ladkin of Bielefeld University (Alt, Alt #2, Archive, Archive of Alt #2 Alt Archive)
Appendices – The people who prepared them for the World Wide Web used Deskscan II to scan photocopies of them
 Final Accident Report – AA965 (Archive, Alt Archive) – Translation by Captain José Bestene Mattar and Maria Isabel Bobrez Orozco
 "At least four of 164 passengers survive U.S. jet crash in Colombia," CNN Zarrella, John. "Tearful relatives head to Colombia," CNN. December 22, 1995.
 "More survivors pulled from wreckage of U.S. jet," CNN. December 21, 1995.
 Dewar, Steuart. "Brown professor, wife, 2 children killed in crash" (Archive). The Associated Press, posted at Brown University.
 BBC Horizon Program interviewing Mercedes Ramirez Johnson, a survivor of AA flight 965
 CNN Evening News for Friday, 22 December 1995 Headline: Colombia / American Airlines Plane Crash Vanderbilt University Television Archive
 Mercedes Ramirez Johnson website
 Mercer, Pamela. "Pair Who Survived a Crash Relieved to Be on Home Soil." The New York Times''. May 19, 1996.
Piamba Cortes v. American Airlines Inc. (Archive)
 B757 Cali Accident in the Compendium of Computer-Related Incidents with Commercial Aircraft including a copy of the Colombian accident report.
 Cockpit voice recording transcript

Aviation accidents and incidents in Colombia
Airliner accidents and incidents involving controlled flight into terrain
Airliner accidents and incidents caused by pilot error
Aviation accidents and incidents in 1995
965
1995 in Colombia
Colombia–United States relations
Accidents and incidents involving the Boeing 757
December 1995 events in the United States
December 1995 events in South America